Methoxyphenol or hydroxyanisole may refer to:

 2-Methoxyphenol (guaiacol, o-methoxyphenol, methylcatechol, 2-hydroxyanisole)
 3-Methoxyphenol (m-methoxyphenol, m-guaiacol, resorcinol monomethyl ether, 3-hydroxyanisole, m-hydroxyanisole)
 4-Methoxyphenol (mequinol, para-guaiacol, 4-hydroxyanisole)

Phenol ethers